Tageteae is a tribe of the plant family Asteraceae. It consists of approximately 260 species divided among 32 genera. All are found in the New World, with a center of diversity in the Mexican highlands. The type genus is Tagetes (marigolds).

Some authors include these plants within a more broadly defined tribe Heliantheae.

Subtribes and genera
Tageteae subtribes and genera recognized by the Global Compositae Database as of April 2022:
Subtribe Flaveriinae 
Flaveria 
Haploesthes 
Sartwellia 
Subtribe Jaumeinae 
Jaumea 
Subtribe Pectidinae 
Adenophyllum 
Arnicastrum 
Bajacalia 
Boeberastrum 
Boeberoides 
Chrysactinia 
Clappia 
Comaclinium 
Dysodiopsis 
Dyssodia 
Gymnolaena 
Harnackia 
Hydropectis 
Jamesianthus 
Lescaillea 
Leucactinia 
Nicolletia 
Oxypappus 
Pectis 
Porophyllum 
Pseudoclappia 
Schizotrichia 
Strotheria 
Tagetes 
Thymophylla 
Urbinella 
Subtribe Varillinae 
Coulterella 
Varilla

References

 
Asteraceae tribes